Minnow Lake is a lake in Clearwater County, Minnesota, in the United States.

Minnow Lake was named from its population of small minnows.

See also
List of lakes in Minnesota

References

Lakes of Minnesota
Lakes of Clearwater County, Minnesota